No Way to Treat an Animal is the debut extended play by Australian indie rock band Spacey Jane, which was issued independently on 16 November 2017. It was predominantly produced by Rob Grant. The EP was preceded by three singles – "Still Running", "Feeding the Family" and "Thrills", and peaked at number 23 on the ARIA Charts in December 2020 – three years after its release.

Background 

Spacey Jane was formed in 2016 by Caleb Harper and Kieran Lama from Geraldton, Western Australia. Ashton Hardman-Le Cornu and Amelia Murray met through a university French class. Lama then met Hardman-Le Cornu through a mutual relationship. From 2016 to 2017, the band played at local venues very regularly, with Lama estimating that when they “started in 2016, [they] played one or two shows a week for a good year and a half".

Writing and production 
The bulk of recording and mastering from No Way to Treat an Animal was done at Poons Head in East Fremantle with Rob Grant. "Still Running" was produced and mixed over the space of nearly two years, with band members in and out for travel.

In an interview with Perth-based music publication Pilerats, frontman Caleb Harper said the EP is "mostly a reflection on experiences, from childhood through to young adulthood – things like breakups or growing up in church, and how they shape identity". He further explained the title of the EP is derived from Kurt Vonnegut's autobiography A Man Without a Country, which writes "Life is no way to treat an animal. Not even a mouse”. Fremantle-based visual artist Alice Ford designed the cover art as well as promotional posters for the EP's release.

Release 
On 18 August 2017, Spacey Jane released their debut single "Still Running" at Mojos Bar in Fremantle. At the same venue on 29 September, "Feeding the Family" was released. Just five days before the EP's release, on 11 November, the third and final single "Thrills" was premiered on Perth community station RTRFM. The band would later win the annual Needle In The Hay Australian music competition for "Thrills", with a limited-run vinyl pressing and music video released as the prize. The band held a launch party for the EP at The Bird, a bar in Perth, on 16 November 2017, with supporting performances by Carla Geneve and Childsaint.

Reception 
Pilerats wrote the EP is a "garage-pop odyssey that sounds crisp as hell", calling it "one of the year's best local EP releases". Nathan Robert, writing for the same website four years later, praised the record and said the singles "disregard psychedelic sensibilities and pay homage to a cleaner, harder rock sound". Writing for Australian publication Happy Mag, Freya McGahey called lead single "Still Running" "impressive and impeccably crafted", pulling off "clarity of tone and sharp lyricism with perfection". She praised the band for "hav[ing] integrated a bold indie pop sound with their own raw Australian top coat".

Gareth Bryant writing for online publication Scenestr commended "Feeding the Family" as a "sensational ear-worm with an infectious riff". The track was also ranked number 44 on Perth station RTRFM's '45 Greatest Songs from Western Australia' 2022 listener poll. Online magazine Eat Your Water called the EP an "immediate radio success".

Track listing 
All tracks written by Caleb Harper, Kieran Lama and Ashton Le Cornu; "Feeding the Family" co-written by Amelia Murray.

 "Thrills" – 3:29
 "Feeding the Family" – 4:44
 "Papava" – 3:53
 "Feels Better" – 4:37
 "Still Running" – 3:33
 "Never Been Sure of Anything" – 3:30

Personnel 
Information adapted from Bandcamp.

Musicians
 Caleb Harper – vocals, guitar, writing
 Amelia Murray – bass, writing (2)
 Ashton Le Cornu – lead guitar, writing
 Kieran Lama – drums, writing
Additional personnel
 Nick Ireland – producer, mixing
 Calum McLaughlin – producer, mixing
 Rob Grant – producer, mastering
 Chet Morgan – producer (5)
 Alice Ford – artwork

Charts

Release history

References 

2017 debut EPs
Music in Perth, Western Australia
2017 in Australian music
Garage rock EPs
Albums produced by Dave Parkin
Spacey Jane albums